John Alexander Mathieson (May 19, 1863 – January 7, 1947) was a Prince Edward Island politician and jurist, the 12th premier.

Mathieson was born in Harrington and was a graduate of Prince of Wales College. He was a schoolmaster and lawyer before entering politics with his election to the province's legislature as a Conservative in 1900. He represented the district of 4th Kings in his first term in the legislature, then shifted to 5th Kings in 1904.

Mathieson sat on the opposition benches becoming Leader of the Opposition and of the Conservative Party in 1903. In December 1911, the Liberal government resigned when Premier H. James Palmer was defeated in a by-election which also caused the governing Liberals to lose their majority in the legislature. The Lieutenant-Governor of Prince Edward Island asked Mathieson as leader of the opposition to form a government, which he did, going on to win a mandate in the 1912 general election.

Mathieson's government pressed the federal government to fulfill the terms on which Prince Edward Island joined Canadian Confederation in 1873. He succeeded in persuading Ottawa to provide an improved annual subsidy to the province and, in 1915, Ottawa announced the creation of a year-round ferry service to connect the island to the mainland. The ferries began operating between PEI and New Brunswick in 1917.

The province was also at risk of losing representation in the House of Commons of Canada due to population shifts. PEI had six MPs when it joined confederation in 1873, this was reduced to four and was to be cut further as a result of the 1911 census. Mathieson persuaded the federal government to agree to an amendment to the British North America Act guaranteeing the province a minimum of four MPs in perpetuity.

In 1917, Premier Mathieson left politics to accept an appointment as Chief Justice and served in that position until he retired in 1943.

External links
 Government of Prince Edward Island biography

1863 births
1947 deaths
People from Queens County, Prince Edward Island
Canadian Presbyterians
Premiers of Prince Edward Island
Judges in Prince Edward Island
Progressive Conservative Party of Prince Edward Island MLAs
Progressive Conservative Party of Prince Edward Island leaders
Prince of Wales College alumni